.pot may refer to:

The extension used for template files in Microsoft PowerPoint
The extension used for template files in GNU gettext

See also
Pot (disambiguation)